Yaman Okay (1951 – 19 February 1993) was a Turkish actor. He won the 1981 Golden Orange Award for Best Supporting Actor for his performance in On Fertile Lands.

Okay was married since 1984 to actress and screenwriter Meral Okay. He died of pancreatic cancer in 1993 and was buried in the Zincirlikuyu Cemetery.

Selected filmography

References

External links
 

1951 births
1993 deaths
Turkish male film actors
Turkish male television actors
Turkish male stage actors
Best Supporting Actor Golden Orange Award winners
20th-century Turkish male actors
Deaths from cancer in Turkey
Deaths from pancreatic cancer
Burials at Zincirlikuyu Cemetery